Georg Erdmann (21 February 1875 – 22 February 1966) was a Norwegian sports shooter. He competed in two events at the 1908 Summer Olympics.

References

1875 births
1966 deaths
Sportspeople from Hamar
Norwegian male sport shooters
Olympic shooters of Norway
Shooters at the 1908 Summer Olympics